In quantum physics, entanglement depth characterizes the strength of multiparticle entanglement. An entanglement depth  means that the quantum state of a particle ensemble cannot be described under the assumption that particles interacted with each other only in groups having fewer than  particles. It has been used to characterize the quantum states created in experiments with cold gases.

Definition 

Entanglement depth appeared first in the context of cold gases, together with entanglement criteria that made it possible to bound it from below based on measured quantities.

We will now present a general definition based on convex sets of quantum states. First, we will define -producibility. Let us consider a pure state that is the tensor product of multi-particle quantum states

The pure state  is said to be -producible if all  are states of at most  particles. A mixed state is called -producible, if it is a mixture of pure states that are all at most -producible.
The -producible mixed states form a convex set.

A quantum state contains at least genuine multiparticle entanglement of  particles, if it is not -producible.

Finally, a quantum state has an entanglement depth , if it is -producible, but not -producible.

References

Quantum information science
Quantum optics